Brett Hage (born October 19, 1974) is a Republican member of the Florida Legislature representing the state's 33rd House district, which includes Sumter County as well as parts of Lake and Marion counties.

History
Hage is the president of T&D Distribution, Inc., which bills itself as the "largest volume Mastic vinyl siding distributor in Florida."

Florida House of Representatives
In the November 6, 2018 general election, Hage defeated Democrat Oren Miller, taking 69.5% of the vote.

References

Hage, Brett
Living people
21st-century American politicians
Samford University alumni
People from Sumter County, Florida
1974 births